is a passenger railway station located in the city of Akashi, Hyōgo Prefecture, Japan, operated by the private Sanyo Electric Railway.

Lines

Station layout
The station consists of three ground-level island platforms serving five tracks, with an elevated station building.

Platforms

Adjacent stations

|-
!colspan=5|Sanyo Electric Railway

History
Higashi-Futami Station opened on August 19, 1923.

Passenger statistics
In fiscal 2018, the station was used by an average of 4,471 passengers daily (boarding passengers only).

Surrounding area
 Akashi City Futami Civic Center
Akashi City Futami Children's Garden
Mikuriya Shrine
Zuio-ji Temple

See also
List of railway stations in Japan

References

External links

  Official website (Sanyo Electric Railway) 

Railway stations in Japan opened in 1923
Railway stations in Hyōgo Prefecture
Akashi, Hyōgo